Sparganothoides capitiornata is a species of moth of the family Tortricidae. It is found in Guatemala.

The length of the forewings is 9.1–10.2 mm for males and 9.9–10.7 mm for females. The ground colour of the forewings is yellowish brown to brown, with a scattering of brown scales and spots. The hindwings are grey. Adults have been recorded on wing in June and July and in October and November, probably in two generations per year.

Etymology
The species name refers to the protuberances of the head and is derived from Latin capitis (meaning head) and ornatus (meaning ornament).

References

Moths described in 2009
Sparganothoides